Bamako Grand Mosque is a mosque in the city centre of Bamako, Mali.  Built on the site of a pre-colonial mud-brick mosque, the current mosque was built through funding from the Saudi Arabian government at the end of the 1970s. One of the tallest structures in Bamako, it is situated north of the Niger River near the central market (Grand Marche) and the colonial-era Bamako Cathedral. With its tall cement minarets built around a square central structure, the building is stylistically closer to Saudi religious structures than West African. The mosque is visible from much of the city and is occasionally opened to tourists.

See also
 Islam in Mali

References

Further reading
Ross Velton. Mali: The Bradt Travel Guide. Guilford, Connecticut: Globe Pequot Press (2000).
Bamako - Mali's colourful and chaotic capital, June 19, 2004. igougo.com.

Mosques in Mali
Buildings and structures in Bamako
Mosques completed in the 1970s